Team dressage equestrian at the 2002 Asian Games was held in Busan Equestrian Grounds, Busan, South Korea on October 8, 2002.

Schedule
All times are Korea Standard Time (UTC+09:00)

Results

References
Results

External links
Official website

Team dressage